Deniz Aydoğdu (born 31 August 1983 in Berlin, Germany) is a Turkish footballer.

Aydoğdu made 2 appearances in the Süper Lig during his playing career.

References 
 
 Deniz Aydoğdu at the Turkish Football Federation

1983 births
Living people
Footballers from Berlin
Turkish footballers
Association football forwards
Süper Lig players
Hertha Zehlendorf players
Füchse Berlin Reinickendorf players
Türkiyemspor Berlin players
Karşıyaka S.K. footballers
Kasımpaşa S.K. footballers
Malatyaspor footballers
Mardinspor footballers
Tennis Borussia Berlin players
Balıkesirspor footballers